Sebastian Piersig (born 28 May 1984 in Spremberg) is a German slalom canoeist who competed at the international level from 2000 to 2009 in the C2 class together with Felix Michel.

He won a silver medal in the C2 team event at the 2006 ICF Canoe Slalom World Championships in Prague. He also won two gold medals in the same event at the European Championships.

Piersig finished sixth in the C2 event at the 2008 Summer Olympics in Beijing.

World Cup individual podiums

References

1984 births
Living people
People from Spremberg
People from Bezirk Cottbus
German male canoeists
Sportspeople from Brandenburg
Olympic canoeists of Germany
Canoeists at the 2008 Summer Olympics
Medalists at the ICF Canoe Slalom World Championships